Albo Hundred was a hundred on the east coast of Scania in southern Sweden.

The administrative center of Albo härad was the village of Brösarp. Today, the 
picturesque fishing village of Kivik (pop. 900) is larger. 

Notable sites are The King's Grave, the dolmen at Haväng  as well as the National park of Stenshuvud.

Socken
The hundred was divided into sockens:

In Simrishamn Municipality
Ravlunda
Sankt Olof
Rörum
Södra Mellby
Vitaby

In Tomelilla Municipality
Fågeltofta
Eljaröd
Andrarum
Brösarp

See also
Allbo Hundred in Småland
Hundreds of Scania